The 39th annual Berlin International Film Festival was held from 10 to 21 February 1989. The Golden Bear was awarded to American film Rain Man directed by Barry Levinson. The retrospective was dedicated to German film producer Erich Pommer and another one dedicated to European productions of 1939 titled Europe 1939.

Jury

The following people were announced as being on the jury for the festival:
 Rolf Liebermann, composer (Switzerland) - Jury President
 Leslie Caron, dancer and actress (France)
 Chen Kaige, director (China)
 Vadim Glowna, actor and director (West Germany)
 Randa Haines, director and screenwriter (United States)
 Vladimir Ignatovski, director of Bulgarska Nacionalna Filmoteka (Bulgaria)
 Adrian Kutter, founder of the Biberach an der Riß Film Festival (West Germany)
 Francisco Rabal, actor (Spain)
 Cliff Robertson, actor (United States)
 Zdeněk Svěrák, actor and screenwriter (Czechoslovakia)
 Boris Vasilyev, writer and screenwriter (Soviet Union)

Films in competition
The following films were in competition for the Golden Bear and Silver Bear awards:

Out of competition
 Abschied vom falschen Paradies, directed by Tevfik Başer (West Germany)
 Another Woman, directed by Woody Allen (USA)
 , directed by Frank Beyer (East Germany)
 Dangerous Liaisons, directed by Stephen Frears (USA)
 , directed by Norbert Kückelmann (West Germany)
 Власть Соловецкая. Свидетельства и документы Vlast Solovetskaya. Svidetelstva i dokumenty, directed by Marina Goldovskaya (Soviet Union)
 War Requiem, directed by Derek Jarman (UK)

Key
{| class="wikitable" width="550" colspan="1"
| style="background:#FFDEAD;" align="center"| †
|Winner of the main award for best film in its section
|}

Retrospective
The following films were shown in the retrospective dedicated to Erich Pommer:

The following films were shown in the retrospective "Europe 1939":

{| class="sortable wikitable" width="78%" cellpadding="5"
|-
!width="25%"| English title
!width="25%"| Original title
!width="20%"| Director(s)
!width="30%"| Country
|-
|A Girl Must Live
|
|Carol Reed
|United Kingdom
|-
|Uproar in Damascus
|Aufruhr in Damaskus
|Gustav Ucicky
|Germany
|-
|Bel Ami
|Bel Ami
|Willi Forst
|Germany
|-
|Wilton's Zoo
|Boefje
|Detlef Sierck
|Netherlands
|-
|The Fight Continues
|Борьба продолжается Borba prodolschajetsa
|Vasily Zhuravlyov
|Soviet Union
|-
|British Movietone of the 07/09/1939
|
|(unknown)
|United Kingdom
|-
|Cheer Boys Cheer
|
|Walter Forde
|United Kingdom
|-
|Crisis
|
|Herbert Kline, Hanuš Burger and Alexander Hammid
|USA
|-
|The Governor
|Der Gouverneur
|Victor Tourjansky
|Germany
|-
|The West Wall
|Der Westwall
|Fritz Hippler
|Germany
|-
|
|Deutsche Kulturfilme (beinhaltet Alpenkorps im Angriff von Gösta Nordhaus und Germanen gegen Pharaonen von Anton Kutter)
|(unknown)
|Germany
|-
|The Journey to Tilsit
|Die Reise nach Tilsit
|Veit Harlan
|Germany
|-
|Do It Now
|
|(unknown)
|United Kingdom
|-
|Dora Nelson
|Dora Nelson
|Mario Soldati
|Italy
|-
|Three Sergeants
|Drei Unteroffiziere
|Werner Hochbaum
|Germany
|-
|-
|Fric-Frac
|Fric-Frac
|Maurice Lehmann
|France
|-
|Goodbye, Mr. Chips
|
|Sam Wood
|United Kingdom
|-
|Hotel Sacher
|Hotel Sacher
|Erich Engel
|Germany
|-
|Spain
|Испания Ispanija
|Esfir Shub
|Soviet Union
|-
|Midsummer Night's Fire
|Johannisfeuer
|Arthur Maria Rabenalt
|Germany
|-
|Two Girls on the Street
|Két lány az utcán
|Andre DeToth
|Hungary
|-
|Kitty and the World Conference
|Kitty und die Weltkonferenz
|Helmut Käutner
|Germany
|-
|
|Kriegsbeginn in der Wochenschau
|Helmut Käutner
|Germany
|-
|The Rules of the Game
|La Règle du Jeu
|Jean Renoir
|France
|-
|The Deserter
|Le Déserteur
|Léonide Moguy
|France
|-
|Daybreak
|Le Jour Se Lève
|Marcel Carné
|France
|-
|Love On The Wing
|
|Norman McLaren
|United Kingdom
|-
|They Staked Their Lives
|Med livet som insats
|Alf Sjöberg
|Sweden
|-
|Threats
|Menaces...
|Edmond T. Gréville
|France
|-
|MFI 754/MFI 812 newsreels
|MFI 754/MFI 812
|(unknown)
|Hungary
|-
|Pathé Journal of the 06/09/1939
|Pathé Journal 06/09/1939'''
|(unknown)
|France
|-
|Q Planes|
|Tim Whelan and Arthur B. Woods
|United Kingdom
|-
|There's No Tomorrow|Sans lendemain|Max Ophüls
|France
|-
|The Oppenheim Family|Семья Оппенгейм Semja Oppengejm|Grigori Roshal
|Soviet Union
|-
|Spare Time|
|Humphrey Jennings
|United Kingdom
|-
|Shchors|Щорс Shchors|Alexander Dovzhenko and Yuliya Solntseva
|Soviet Union
|-
|The First Days|
|Humphrey Jennings, Harry Watt and Pat Jackson
|United Kingdom
|-
|The Four Feathers|
|Zoltan Korda
|United Kingdom
|-
|The Lion Has Wings|
|Michael Powell, Brian Desmond Hurst and Adrian Brunel 
|United Kingdom
|-
|The Spy in Black|
|Michael Powell
|United Kingdom
|-
|They Knew What They Wanted|
|Garson Kanin
|USA
|-
|
|Ufa Tonwoche 440 vom 9.2.1939|(unknown)
|Germany
|-
|
|Ufa Tonwoche 468 vom 23.8.1939|(unknown)
|Germany
|-
|
|Ufa Tonwoche 469 vom 30.8.1939|(unknown)
|Germany
|-
|
|Ufa Tonwoche vom 7.9.1939|(unknown)
|Germany
|-
|The New Teacher|Учитель Uchitel|Sergei Gerasimov
|Soviet Union
|-
|Constable Studer|Wachtmeister Studer|Leopold Lindtberg
|Switzerland
|-
|War Library Items 1, 2, 3|
|(unknown)
|United Kingdom
|-
|Gorky 2: My Apprenticeship|V lyudyakh В людях|Mark Donskoy
|Soviet Union
|-
|The Vyborg Side|Выборгская сторона Vyborgskaya storona|Grigori Kozintsev and Leonid Trauberg
|Soviet Union
|}

Awards

The following prizes were awarded by the Jury:
 Golden Bear: Rain Man by Barry Levinson
 Silver Bear – Special Jury Prize: Wan zhong by Wu Ziniu
 Silver Bear for Best Director: Dušan Hanák for Ja milujem, ty miluješ Silver Bear for Best Actress: Isabelle Adjani for Camille Claude Silver Bear for Best Actor: Gene Hackman for Mississippi Burning Silver Bear for an outstanding single achievement: Eric Bogosian for Talk Radio Silver Bear for an outstanding artistic contribution: Kaipo Cohen and Gila Almagor for Ha-Kayitz Shel Aviya Honourable Mention: La bande des quatre by Jacques Rivette
 Alfred-Bauer Prize: SlugaFIPRESCI AwardLa bande des quatre by Jacques Rivette
UNICEF AwardJuliana'' by Chaski Group (Peru)

References

External links
 39th Berlin International Film Festival 1989
 1989 Berlin International Film Festival
 Berlin International Film Festival:1989 at Internet Movie Database

39
1989 film festivals
1980s in West Berlin
1989 in Berlin
1989 in West Germany
Berl
Berlin